Kozhanka is an urban-type settlement in Fastiv Raion (district) of Kyiv Oblast (province) in northern Ukraine. It hosts the administration of Kozhanka settlement hromada, one of the hromadas of Ukraine. Kozhanka's population was 2,697 as of the 2001 Ukrainian Census. Current population:

References

External links
 

Fastiv Raion
Urban-type settlements in Fastiv Raion
Populated places established in 1972